Radoslav Mitrevski (born 22 April 1981) is a former Bulgarian footballer, who played as a defender.

Mitrevski previously played for CSKA Sofia, Marek Dupnitsa, Pirin Blagoevgrad and Minyor Pernik.

References

1981 births
Living people
Sportspeople from Blagoevgrad
Bulgarian footballers
First Professional Football League (Bulgaria) players
Second Professional Football League (Bulgaria) players
OFC Pirin Blagoevgrad players
PFC Pirin Blagoevgrad players
PFC CSKA Sofia players
PFC Marek Dupnitsa players
FC Bansko players
PFC Vidima-Rakovski Sevlievo players
FC Septemvri Simitli players
PFC Minyor Pernik players
Association football defenders